The 2013 African Judo Championships were the 34th edition of the African Judo Championships, and were held in Maputo, Mozambique from 18 April to 19 April 2013.

Medal overview

Men

Women

Medals table

References

External links
 

African Championships
African Judo Championships
International sports competitions hosted by Mozambique
Judo
Sport in Maputo
April 2013 sports events in Africa